Regional Cycle Route 42 is a regional bicycling route in Suffolk, England from Snape to Bramfield through the Suffolk Coast and Heaths, an Area of Outstanding Natural Beauty.

Route

Snape | Friston | Knodishall | Eastbridge | Minsmere | Dunwich | Bramfield

Links to:
 RCR 41 just south of Snape
 NCR 1 just north of Bramfield

This route takes one through Suffolk Coast and Heaths, an Area of Outstanding Natural Beauty and close to Leiston Abbey, Dunwich Heath, Minsmere RSPB reserve, the historic village of Dunwich and the Suffolk Coast National Nature Reserve.

See also
 Tourist Information from Visit Suffolk' about cyclings along the coast
 Discover Suffolk Coast and heaths
 Get Cycling in Suffolk
 Map from Sustrans

Cycleways in England
Transport in Suffolk